= Life Could Be Verse =

Life Could Be Verse: Reflections on Love, Loss, and What Really Matters is an autobiography of Kirk Douglas that he published on his 98th birthday.

The book contains Douglas' poems, autobiographical stories, and professional and family photographs.
